is a song by Japanese singer-songwriter Fujii Kaze, taken from his second studio album Love All Serve All (2022). It was released on May 3, 2021, through Hehn Records and Universal Sigma. Written by Fujii himself and produced by Yaffle, the song is a pop track infused with a funky disco sound, expressing the importance of the kirari moments in daily lives. The song featured in Japan's Honda Vezel 2021 advertisement. 

A music video for "Kirari" premiered on May 21. It was directed by Spikey John, who previously directed Fujii's "Mo-Eh-Wa" music video (2019). The song debuted and peaked at number two on the Billboard Japan Hot 100. Fujii gave the televised debut performance of "Kirari", alongside "Mo-Eh-Yo", at 72nd NHK Kōhaku Uta Gassen on December 31, which he pretended to perform the song remotely from his house at Satoshō, Okayama, before surprising that he was already in Tokyo International Forum, where the show held. The remix EP, titled Kirari Remixes (Asia Edition), was released on January 14, 2022.

Track listing
 Digital download / streaming
  – 3:51

 Remixes EP (Kirari Remixes (Asia Edition))
 "Kirari" (original remix) – 4:19
 "Kirari" (Daul remix) – 4:05
 "Kirari" (FunkyMo remix) – 4:31
 "Kirari" (PXZVC remix) – 4:47
 "Kirari" (Kaze & Yaffle Just for Fun remix) – 3:41
 "Kirari" (Knopha remix) – 5:05
 "Kirari" (Naken remix) – 4:09
 "Kirari" (Yaffle remix) – 3:04
 "Kirari" – 3:51

Credits and personnel

 Fujii Kaze – vocals, songwriter, synthesizer
 Yaffle – producer, recording arrangement
 Bunta Otsuki – electric guitar

Charts

Weekly charts

Year-end charts

Certifications

Release history

References

2021 singles
2021 songs
Fujii Kaze songs
Songs used as jingles
Universal Sigma singles